Clach Bheinn is a hill near Lochgoilhead in the Ardgoil Peninsula and is within the Arrochar Alps. The hill reaches a height of 441 m.

Mountains and hills of Argyll and Bute